Nathaniel Thomas may refer to:

 Nathaniel Thomas (writer) (1730–?), Welsh writer and editor
 Nathaniel Phillips Smith Thomas (1844–1890), American politician
 Nathaniel Thomas (Massachusetts judge) (1643–1718), English colonial magistrate, politician, and militia officer
 Nathaniel S. Thomas (1867–1937), bishop of the Episcopal Diocese of Wyoming